Joseph "Joe" Frasson (September 3, 1935November 21, 2016) was a NASCAR Winston Cup Series driver. Born in Golden Valley, Minnesota, USA, his Winston Cup Series career spanned from 1969 to 1978, with four top-5 and nineteen top-10 finishes. He had an abortive attempt at participating in the Budweiser Late Model Sportsman Series in 1982.

Personality 
Frasson's anger management issues caused him to frequently lose his temper when he failed to qualify in NASCAR Cup Series races. His fierce and independent attitude during his NASCAR career would preclude the need for corporate sponsors and being a part of a multi-vehicle organization. Having a rather gruff appearance, he was not apologetic to NASCAR media present at the race, and he showed an element of rudeness that people in the Southern United States stereotypically pictured people from the Northern United States as being.

Career
Frasson completed  of racing with overall career earnings of $148,930 ($ when adjusted for inflation). Frasson was a runner-up for the 1970 NASCAR Rookie of the Year award to Bill Dennis). In addition to this, he was also a competitor at the 1971 Daytona 500. During his NASCAR career, Frasson had his best results on the short tracks, with an average finish of 19th place while on road courses he averaged 33rd place finishes.

The racing eventually took a heavy burden on his finances because of his absolute devotion to being a "pure short track racer." Frasson was friends with Marion Cox and once drove his vehicle to race; where he would move up the pack to an impressive finish. Being a critic of today's NASCAR, he refers to the current racing style as 'Oh, don't you bump that car in front of you. We'll fine you and bar you!', preferring the days when drivers appreciated the glass of wine at the post-race ceremonies instead of their multimillion-dollar paychecks. Frasson was believed to hire temporary crew members for the early part of the 1973 NASCAR Winston Cup Series season; particularly at the 1973 World 600.

His primary vehicle throughout his career was his #18 Buick; which was owned, operated, and sponsored by himself. Frasson has driven Chevrolet and Dodge vehicles as his secondary racing vehicles and has appeared 14 times at Talladega Superspeedway.

References

1935 births
NASCAR drivers
People from Golden Valley, Minnesota
Racing drivers from Minneapolis
Racing drivers from Minnesota
2016 deaths